Nikola Katić (born 10 October 1996) is a Croatian professional footballer who plays as a centre-back for FC Zürich.

Club career

Early career
Katić started his football career in 2001 at HNK Stolac in his native Stolac, before moving on to NK Neretvanac in Opuzen, Croatia. He was soon moved to the club's senior team and started featuring in Treća HNL Jug. A year later, he went on a trial with HNK Hajduk Split's reserve team, but did not sign. A year later, however, he moved to top-tier NK Slaven Belupo. Initially mostly featuring for the youth team, Katić broke into the club's first squad in the 2016–17 season.

Rangers
In June 2018, Katić left Slaven to join Scottish Premiership club Rangers on a four-year deal, for an undisclosed transfer fee.

On 29 December 2019, Katić scored the winning goal in a 2–1 victory in the Old Firm against Celtic, the first win at Celtic Park for Rangers since 2010.

FC Zürich
On 31 August 2022, Katić joined Swiss Super League club FC Zürich for an undisclosed fee on a three-year contract.

International career
Katić represented Croatia at under-21 level, playing against Austria and Slovenia in 2017. Katić was called up to the senior Croatia team in May 2017, and he made his full international debut as a late substitute for Ivan Santini in a 2–1 win against Mexico.

He was named in Croatia's squad for UEFA Under-21 Euro 2019 and was featured in all three group stage matches as Croatia finished last in the group following losses to Romania and France and a draw with England.

Career statistics

Club

International

Honours
Hajduk Split
Croatian Cup: 2021–22

References

External links
 

1996 births
Living people
People from Ljubuški
Croats of Bosnia and Herzegovina
Association football central defenders
Croatian footballers
Croatia under-21 international footballers
Croatia international footballers
NK Slaven Belupo players
Rangers F.C. players
HNK Hajduk Split players
FC Zürich players
Second Football League (Croatia) players
Croatian Football League players
Scottish Professional Football League players
Croatian expatriate footballers
Expatriate footballers in Scotland
Croatian expatriate sportspeople in Scotland
Expatriate footballers in Switzerland
Croatian expatriate sportspeople in Switzerland